Evan G. Davies was a member of the Wisconsin State Assembly.

Biography
Davies was born on July 14, 1877, in Genesee, Wisconsin. He died there on November 22, 1967, and was buried in Wales, Wisconsin.

Assembly career
Davies was a member of the Assembly during the 1925, 1927, 1929 and 1931 sessions. He was a Republican.

References

External links

Wisconsin Historical Society

People from Genesee, Wisconsin
Republican Party members of the Wisconsin State Assembly
American Presbyterians
20th-century Presbyterians
1877 births
1967 deaths
Burials in Wisconsin